Monchazy (Mansaźı) is a rural locality (a village) in Okhlebininsky Selsoviet, Iglinsky District, Bashkortostan, Russia. The population was 168 as of 2010. There are 3 streets.

Geography 
Monchazy is located 41 km south of Iglino (the district's administrative centre) by road. Okhlebinino is the nearest rural locality.

References 

Rural localities in Iglinsky District